Brian Richardson (born June 7, 1955) is an American bobsledder. He competed in the two man event at the 1992 Winter Olympics.

References

External links
 

1955 births
Living people
American male bobsledders
Olympic bobsledders of the United States
Bobsledders at the 1992 Winter Olympics
Sportspeople from San Jose, California